Paul Henry de Kruif (rhyming with "life") (March 2, 1890 – February 28, 1971) was an American microbiologist and author of Dutch descent. Publishing as Paul de Kruif, he is most noted for his 1926 book, Microbe Hunters.  This book was not only a bestseller for a lengthy period after publication, but has remained high on lists of recommended reading for science and has been an inspiration for many aspiring physicians and scientists.

Biography

Early life
De Kruif was born March 2, 1890, in Zeeland, Michigan. In 1912, he graduated from the University of Michigan with a bachelor's degree, and he remained there to obtain a Ph.D., which was granted in 1916. He immediately entered service as a private in Mexico on the Pancho Villa Expedition and afterwards served as a lieutenant and a captain in World War I in France. Because of his service in the Sanitary Corps, he had occasional contacts with leading French biologists of the period.

Career
After returning to the University of Michigan as an assistant professor, De Kruif briefly worked for the Rockefeller Institute (for Medical Research). He then became a full-time writer.

De Kruif assisted Sinclair Lewis with his Pulitzer Prize-winning novel Arrowsmith (1925) by providing the scientific and medical information required by the plot, along with character sketches. Even though Lewis was listed as the sole author, De Kruif's contribution was significant, and he received 25 percent of the royalties. Many believe the characters in the novel represent people known to De Kruif, with Martin Arrowsmith (a physician, unlike de Kruif) possibly representing himself.

While working for the Rockefeller Institute, De Kruif submitted an anonymous entry about modern medicine, for a book entitled Civilization. In the article, he decried the state of contemporary medical practice, which, because it lacked scientifically sound practices, he called "medical Ga-Ga-ism". De Kruif decried doctors as providing only a "mélange of religious ritual, more or less accurate folk-lore, and commercial cunning". When it was discovered that De Kruif was the author of the essay, he was fired from the Rockefeller Institute.

Ronald Ross, one of the scientists featured in Microbe Hunters, took exception to how he was described, so the British edition deleted that chapter to avoid a libel suit.

De Kruif was a staff writer for the Ladies' Home Journal, Country Gentleman, and Reader's Digest, contributing articles on science and medicine. He also served on commissions to promote research into infantile paralysis (polio).

The Sweeping Wind, De Kruif's last book, is his autobiography.

De Kruif died February 28, 1971, in Holland, Michigan.

Works

 Our Medicine Men (1922)
 Microbe Hunters (1926)
 Hunger Fighters (1928)
 Seven Iron Men (1929)
 Men Against Death (1932)
 Why Keep Them Alive (1937)
 The Fight for Life (1938)
 The Male Hormone (1945)
 Health is Wealth (1940)
 Life Among the Doctors (1949)
 Kaiser Wakes the Doctors (1940)
 A Man Against Insanity (1957)
 The Sweeping Wind (1962)

Influential articles by Paul de Kruif
 "How We Can Help Feed Europe, in Reader's Digest, Sept. 1945 (p. 50-52). About the Meals for Millions Foundation and their Multi-Purpose Food.

Microbe Hunters
De Kruif's celebrated 1926 book Microbe Hunters consists of chapters on the following figures of medicine's "Heroic Age":

 Anton van Leeuwenhoek (1632–1723) – the invention of a simple microscope and the discovery of microorganisms. 
 Lazzaro Spallanzani (1729–1799) – biogenesis.
 Robert Koch (1843–1910) – identification of pathogens. 
 Louis Pasteur (1822–1895) – bacteria, biogenesis.
 Emile Roux (1853–1933) and Emil von Behring (1854–1917) – diphtheria.   
 Elie Metchnikoff (1845–1916) – phagocytes. 
 Theobald Smith (1859–1934) – animal vectors and ticks. 
 David Bruce (1855–1931) – tsetse flies and sleeping sickness. 
 Ronald Ross (1857–1932) and Battista Grassi (1854–1925) – malaria. 
 Walter Reed (1851–1902) – yellow fever.
 Paul Ehrlich (1854–1915) – the magic-bullet concept applied to syphilis (see the 1940 film Dr. Ehrlich's Magic Bullet).

Notes

Bibliography
 Summers, William C. (1998) "Microbe Hunters revisited", International Microbiology 1: 65–68. online
 Verhave, Jan Peter (Spring 2013) "Paul de Kruif: A Michigan Leader in Public Health", Michigan Historical Review 39: 41–69.

External links

 

University of Michigan alumni
American microbiologists
American people of Dutch descent
Writers from Michigan
1890 births
1971 deaths
People from Zeeland, Michigan